CSCO may refer to:
 the NASDAQ ticker symbol for Cisco Systems
 Complete set of commuting observables
 the publication series Corpus Scriptorum Christianorum Orientalium